Sanela Sijerčić is a Bosnian folk singer from Sarajevo. She has released six albums and received a "Folk Oscar" in 2006. She has also been named the "Female singer of the year" (in Bosnia).  She reportedly "retired" from active recording and performing by 2009.

Discography
Kap po kap (1995)
Odgovori (1998)
Srce od papira (2000)
Rodjendan (2002)
Fenix (2005)

References

 Sanelle Sijercic (Kap Ko Kap) Nimfa Sound Album

Living people
Singers from Sarajevo
Bosniaks of Bosnia and Herzegovina
21st-century Bosnia and Herzegovina women singers
Hayat Production artists
Bosnia and Herzegovina folk-pop singers
20th-century Bosnia and Herzegovina women singers
1976 births